Prhajevo is a small settlement northwest of Velike Lašče in central Slovenia. The entire Municipality of Velike Lašče lies in the traditional region of Lower Carniola. It is included in the Central Slovenia Statistical Region.

References

External links
Prhajevo on Geopedia

Populated places in the Municipality of Velike Lašče